Malope malacoides is a species of plants in the family Malvaceae.

Sources

References 

Flora of Malta
Malvaceae